225th Brigade may refer to:
225th Mixed Brigade (Spain)
225th Brigade (United Kingdom)
225th Engineer Brigade (United States)